Pat Healy (born September 14, 1971) is an American film and television actor, best known for his roles in Better Call Saul, Great World of Sound, Compliance and Station 19, in which he was upgraded to the main cast in 2022. He directed his first feature film, Take Me, in 2017.

Life and career
Healy was born in Chicago, Illinois, where his career began at the Steppenwolf Theatre. He moved to Los Angeles in 1998, where he quickly landed a memorable supporting role in Paul Thomas Anderson's Magnolia as the pharmacist on the receiving end of Julianne Moore's profane meltdown. He has since appeared in over thirty feature films, including Ghost World, The Assassination of Jesse James by the Coward Robert Ford, Rescue Dawn, Captain America: The Winter Soldier, Draft Day, Harmony and Me, Dirty Girl, Snow Angels, Undertow, Pearl Harbor, and Home Alone 3.

In 2007, Healy played the lead in Great World of Sound, an independent film directed by Craig Zobel and produced by David Gordon Green. The film premiered at the Sundance Film Festival, and Healy was the recipient of the Atlanta Film Festival Best Actor Award. Healy also appeared in Zobel's follow-up, Compliance, as a prank caller that incites a series of disturbing events at a fast food restaurant. He starred in Ti West's horror film The Innkeepers and in Cheap Thrills, alongside Ethan Embry, Sara Paxton and David Koechner. The dark comedy, directed by E.L. Katz, won the Midnight Films Audience Award at South by Southwest in 2013 before its acquisition by Alamo Drafthouse.

On television, Healy has appeared on Six Feet Under, Star Trek: Enterprise, 24, Grey's Anatomy, The Shield, CSI: Crime Scene Investigation, Without a Trace, NCIS, Cold Case, Charmed, CSI: Miami, Chicago Hope, NYPD Blue, and The Practice. He had a recurring role as the villain Sugalski on Eagleheart, as well as a celebrity guest appearance in Metalocalypse on Adult Swim.

In 2000, Healy wrote and directed the short film Mullitt, starring himself, Michael Shannon and Henry Gibson. The film premiered at the 2001 Sundance Film Festival before being acquired by HBO. His feature scripts Snow Ponies and Strange Skies landed spots on the Black List in 2006 and 2007, respectively. He has also written three episodes of HBO's In Treatment, Weeks 1–3 of Walter (John Mahoney)'s sessions in Season Two.

Healy's feature directorial debut Take Me premiered at Tribeca Film Festival in April 2017. The film was produced by Duplass Brothers Productions and stars Healy alongside Taylor Schilling. It was acquired by The Orchard for a May 2017 release.

In 2022, Healy took over the role of Jeff in the sixth and final season of Better Call Saul from Don Harvey.

Filmography

Film

Television

References

External links
 
 
 

1971 births
20th-century American male actors
21st-century American male actors
American male film actors
American male television actors
Living people
Male actors from Chicago